Syed Nawab Ali Chowdhury  (29 December 1863 – 17 April 1929) was Nawab of Dhanbari of Tangail in East Bengal (modern day Bangladesh). He was one of the founders of Dhaka University. He was the first Muslim minister of united Bengal. He was minister of education. His grandson Muhammad Ali Bogra was third prime minister of Pakistan. His son Syed Hasan Ali Chowdhury was minister of East Pakistan government.

Birth and childhood
Nawab Ali Chowdhury was born in Dhanbari, Tangail to a zamindar family. 250 years prior to his birth his great grandfather Shah Syed Khuda Bokhs settled in Dhanbari. Nawab Ali Chowdhury was taught Arabic, Persian, Bengali by his tutor in his childhood. He went to Rajshahi Collegiate School and later graduated from St. Xavier's College.

Litarute
He was engaged in literary and cultural activities from 1895 to 1904. In 1895 newspaper named ‘’Mihir’’ and ‘’Shudhakar’’ became ‘’Mihir-Shudhakar’’ combinedly. Nawab Ali Chowdhury was its owner. He bought a press for it and set in his house in Calcutta. He contributed in work of Muhammad Shahidullah, Reazuddin Ahmed al-Mashhadi, poet Md.Mozammel Haque. These writers dedicated their some writings to Nawab Ali Chowdhury.

He also wrote some books. They are:
Eid ul Azha (1890)
Maulud Sharif (1903)
Vernacular Education in Bengal (1900)
Primary Education in Rural Areas (1906)
Some Moral and Religious Teachings of Imam Al-Ghazzali (1920)

Entrance in politics

He took active part in politics after Partition of Bengal. Despite of opposition from Hindu Nationalists partition took place and a new province named Bengal and Assam was created. Nawab Ali Chowdhury realized for an all Indian Muslim political organization. He condemned illiteracy as the cause of Muslim's backwardness.

Foundation of University of Dhaka

On 29 August 1911 at a ceremony of farewell to Lanchet Heir and reception of Charles Bailey, Nawab Salimullah and Nawab Ali Chowdhury demanded the establishment of a university in Dhaka. On 31 January 1912, at the time of Lord Hardinge's staying in Dhaka a committee of 19 members including Nawab Salimullah and Nawab Ali Chowdhury met him and explained him that how Muslims have harmed because of reunification of Bengal. For this 13 membered Nathan Committee was formed and Nawab Ali Chowdhury became member. Under this committee 6 sub-committee was formed. He was also member of these. World War I broke out in 1914 and it effected establishment of University of Dhaka. Nawab Ali Chowdhury was member of imperial council that time. In 1917 he again introduced the matter of University of Dhaka on council's meeting table. Assembly passed Dhaka University Act in 1920. Class was started from 1921. Nawab Ali Chowdhury gave 16,000 taka to University of Dhaka for student's scholarship. During establishment he mortgaged a part of his zamidari and gave 35,000 taka for university.

On 9 June 2003, university syndicate decided to change the name of senate building to "Syed Nawab Ali Chowdhury Building".

Work for education
Nawab Ali Chowdhury was the first Muslim minister of united Bengal. He was given the office of education minister because of his role in promoting education. He held this post till his death. He helped with land and money a total of 38 educational institutions. In 1910, he established high school "Nawab Institute" in Dhanbari, his own area. Besides he contributed to establish many other educational institute.

Death

Nawab Ali Chowdhury died on 17 April 1929 at Eden Castle in Darjeeling (modern day India).

References

External links
 The Muslim Heritage of Bengal in Google books.

1863 births
1929 deaths
Bengali politicians
University of Dhaka
Companions of the Order of the Indian Empire
People from Tangail District
Bogra family